Within women's tennis competitions, the Group C of the 1992 Federation Cup Americas Zone was one of four pools in the Americas zone of the 1992 Federation Cup. Four teams competed in a round robin competition, with the top two teams advancing to the knockout stage..

Cuba vs. Colombia

Bolivia vs. Dominican Republic

Colombia vs. Bolivia

Cuba vs. Dominican Republic

Cuba vs. Bolivia

Colombia vs. Dominican Republic

See also
Fed Cup structure

References

External links
 Fed Cup website

1992 Federation Cup Americas Zone